SET Taiwan is a television channel of the Sanlih E-Television in Taiwan, launched in September 1993. It mainly broadcasts Taiwanese drama.

Productions Drama

Daily 
Ah Bian and Ah Jane
Accompany Me Through Life
Nine Refers to the Bride
Taiwan Ah Cheng
Negative Line of Tears
Fiery Thunderbolt
Sky and Earth Has Affection
Taiwan Tornado
Golden Ferris Wheel
Unique Flavor
I Shall Succeed
Love Above All
My Family My Love
Lee Family Reunion
Wives
The Heart of Woman
Ordinary Love
Taste of Life
In The Family
The Sound of Happiness

Friday 
Way Back into Love
Rainy Night Flower
Father
Flavor of Life
White Magnolia
Once Upon a Time in Beitou
Our Mother
Life of Pearl
An Adopted Daughter
La Grande Chaumiere Violette
My Sister

External links
 SET Taiwan official website

1993 establishments in Taiwan
Television stations in Taiwan
Television channels and stations established in 1993
Sanlih E-Television